Where Are We Going, Dad? is a 2014 Chinese film based on a television reality show of the same name. A second film, Where Are We Going, Dad? 2, was released on February 19, 2015.

Reception
The film grossed RMB88.2 million (US$14.6 million) in its opening day, a record for a non-3D Chinese film at the Chinese box office. Its record breaking even caught the attention of the BBC and the LA Times. It grossed RMB308.91 million (US$50.97 million) in the first four days.

References

2014 documentary films
Chinese documentary films
Films based on television series
Fatherhood
Beijing Enlight Pictures films
2010s Mandarin-language films